Amal Mahmoud Osman (born 21 October 1978), also known as Amal Mahmoud Hanafy, is an Egyptian powerlifter who competes on behalf of her country. She has won medals at three successive Summer Paralympics.

Career
Mahmoud competed in her first Summer Paralympics at the 2008 Games in Beijing, China. She won the silver medal in the  powerlifting category behind China's Bian Jianxin. Jianxin broke the World and Paralympic records twice in successive lifts to win the gold medal.

China's Yujiao Tan secured the gold medal, while Raushan Koishibayeva won the silver for Kazakhstan. Following the games, Mahmoud was one of the medal winners who was invited to meet Abdel Fattah el-Sisi, President of Egypt.

References

External links 
 

Living people
Egyptian powerlifters
Powerlifters at the 2008 Summer Paralympics
Powerlifters at the 2012 Summer Paralympics
Powerlifters at the 2016 Summer Paralympics
Paralympic silver medalists for Egypt
Paralympic bronze medalists for Egypt
African Games bronze medalists for Egypt
African Games medalists in weightlifting
Competitors at the 2015 African Games
Medalists at the 2008 Summer Paralympics
Medalists at the 2012 Summer Paralympics
Medalists at the 2016 Summer Paralympics
1978 births
Paralympic medalists in powerlifting
Paralympic powerlifters of Egypt
Powerlifters at the 2020 Summer Paralympics